"思い出になるの？" is the 19th single released by Tamaki Nami. The song marks the first to be released under the moniker "nami".

Music video 
Aired version: This version of the music video only shows Nami for 2 seconds. It instead focuses on many different women who sing along to the song, giving off the meaning and showing how a girl is affected by a boyfriend when he cheats on her. Many of the girls in the music video are crying or breaking down.

Nami Version: Much like the previous version, this one shows more shots of Nami singing the song, as well as showing emotions similar to that of the other girls in the PV especially when it appears that she is on the verge of crying. This version of the PV will be released on the DVD with her album STEP.

Single versions 
Unlike her previous singles, it comes in only a regular CD edition.
Nami's face is hidden on the cover of the single, in order to show the fact that she is hiding her tears, as well as an attempt to market her as a fresh artist.

References

External links
 http://www.tamaki-nami.net/
 https://web.archive.org/web/20090610040000/http://www.namitamaki73.net/

2009 singles
Nami Tamaki songs
2009 songs
Universal Music Japan singles